The following is a list of all stations of the Paris Métro. As of the end of May 2022, there are a total of 308 stations on 16 different lines.

Introductory notes
 Stations are often named after a square or a street, which, in turn, is named for something or someone else.
 A number of stations, such as Avron or Vaugirard, are named after Paris neighbourhoods (though not necessarily located in them), whose names, in turn, usually go back to former villages or hamlets that have long since been incorporated into the City of Paris.
 The use of double names, such as Reuilly – Diderot or Strasbourg – Saint-Denis, often goes back to two (or more) stations on separate lines that were originally named independently and became associated as interchange stations. Notably, Marcadet – Poissonniers is an interchange station consisting of the original Marcadet on Line 4 and the original Poissonniers on Line 12. In many instances, however, the practice of double naming was extended to other stations, usually because these stations are located at the intersection of streets carrying these names. Examples include Alma – Marceau and Faidherbe – Chaligny.
 Many stations have been renamed during the last century. There have been periods of history during which a significant number of stations were renamed. For example, once Germany declared war on France in 1914, it was decided to rename Berlin as Liège and Allemagne (French for "Germany") as Jaurès. The period during which the most stations were renamed was undoubtedly the post-World War II period; Marbeuf at the centre of the Champs-Élysées was renamed Franklin D. Roosevelt in 1946 and Aubervilliers-Villette was renamed Stalingrad the same year.

Stations

Closed stations

Stations closed to the public

Stations that were never opened to the public

Merged stations

See also

 List of RER stations
 List of Transilien stations
 List of tram stops in Île-de-France
 List of Paris railway stations

Notes

Paris
Metro stations
List of Paris Metro stations
 
Paris Railway stations